Cody Lewis Risien (born March 22, 1957) is a former American football offensive tackle who played 11 seasons in the National Football League with the Cleveland Browns. He is a 1975 graduate of Cy-Fair High School in Houston, Texas. He retired from Austin Commercial, a large commercial construction manager, in Austin, TX. Cody worked as a Sr. Project Manager for over 20 years prior to retiring.

Legacy
Cody was inducted into the Cleveland Browns Hall of Legends in 2010.

Risien blocked for four 1,000-yard rushers.

He was a part of five AFC Central Division titles (1980, 1985, 1986, 1987, 1989)… He was selected to two Pro Bowls (1987, 1988).

Cody was inducted into the Texas A&M Athletic Hall of Fame in 2011

Kathie Lee Gifford named her son after Cody Risien, coincidentally both Cody's were born on March 22.

1957 births
Living people
People from Bryan, Texas
American football offensive tackles
Texas A&M Aggies football players
Cleveland Browns players
American Conference Pro Bowl players
Players of American football from Texas
Ed Block Courage Award recipients